Ma Xiaodong (born October 10, 1982) is a Chinese former competitive figure skater. He is the 2000–01 Junior Grand Prix Final champion, 2003 Golden Spin of Zagreb champion, and 2002 Chinese national bronze medalist. He placed fourth at two World Junior Championships and in the top ten at three Four Continents Championships.

Programs

Competitive highlights 
GP: Grand Prix; JGP: Junior Grand Prix

References

External links
 

Chinese male single skaters
Figure skaters from Harbin
1982 births
Living people